Erythroargyrops is a genus of parasitic flies in the family Tachinidae.

Species
Erythroargyrops elegans Townsend, 1917

Distribution
Peru.

References

Diptera of South America
Exoristinae
Tachinidae genera
Taxa named by Charles Henry Tyler Townsend
Monotypic Brachycera genera